The Game Awards 2014 ceremony, which honored the best video games of 2014, took place at The AXIS in Las Vegas on December 5, 2014. The show was produced and hosted by Geoff Keighley. The ceremony was the first for The Game Awards, which replaced the Keighley-hosted Spike Video Game Awards (VGX in 2013) that were discontinued after the 2013 show. Dragon Age: Inquisition won the shows's Game of the Year award.

Premieres 
This year's ceremony featured premieres of Nintendo's Super Mario Maker, Code Name: S.T.E.A.M. and The Legend of Zelda: Breath of the Wild, Kojima Productions's Metal Gear Solid V: The Phantom Pain, Visceral Games's Battlefield Hardline, FromSoftware's Bloodborne, Supermassive Games's Until Dawn, Ready at Dawn's The Order: 1886, Crystal Dynamics's Lara Croft and the Temple of Osiris, CD Projekt's The Witcher 3: Wild Hunt; The Odd Gentlemen's King's Quest, Three One Zero's Adrift and Natsume's Godzilla. There were other premieres including Facepunch Studios's Before, Stoic's The Banner Saga 2, Fullbright's Tacoma, Robotoki's Human Element and Hello Games's No Man's Sky.

The broadcast saw a total viewership of about 1.9 million.

Winners and nominees 
The nominees for The Game Awards 2014 were announced on November 20, 2014. Candidate games must have a release date of November 25, 2014 or earlier in order to be eligible.

The winners were announced during the awards ceremony on December 5, 2014. Winners are shown first in bold, and indicated with a double-dagger (‡).

Jury-voted awards

Fan-voted awards

Honorary awards

Games with multiple nominations and awards

References

External links

2014 awards
2014 awards in the United States
2014 in Nevada
2014 in video gaming
Zappos Theater
The Game Awards ceremonies
2014 video game awards